Joel Little (born 13 February 1983) is a New Zealand record producer, musician and Grammy Award-winning songwriter. He is best known for his work as a writer and producer with artists Lorde, Taylor Swift, Broods, Sam Smith, Imagine Dragons, Ellie Goulding, Khalid, Elliphant, Jarryd James, Shawn Mendes, Marina Diamandis, Amy Shark, Goodnight Nurse, Olivia Rodrigo, Years & Years, and the Jonas Brothers.

Career 

Little trained at the Music and Audio Institute of New Zealand (MAINZ) in Auckland, and began his career as singer and guitarist of the pop punk band Goodnight Nurse. The band released two studio albums, Always and Never (2006) and Keep Me on Your Side (2008) both of which peaked at number five on the New Zealand top 40 albums chart. Over the two albums, the band had five singles in the New Zealand top-40 from 2004 to 2008.

Goodnight Nurse guitarist Sam McCarthy and Little produced and also co-wrote the majority of the debut album released by McCarthy's new group, Kids of 88. The album, Sugarpills was released in 2010 and debuted at number two in the New Zealand album chart. It featured three hit singles, "My House", "Just a Little Bit" and "Downtown" co-written by Little. "Just a Little Bit" went on to win Single of the Year at the 2010 New Zealand Music Awards.

In 2011, Little set up his own production studio, Golden Age, in Morningside, Auckland.

In 2012, Little co-wrote and produced, recorded and mixed The Love Club EP by Lorde at Golden Age. Singles "Royals" and "Tennis Court" both charted at number one in New Zealand in 2013, with the EP achieving gold certification in New Zealand and Platinum certification in Australia. Little also co-wrote, produced, mixed, engineered and played the instruments on the debut Lorde album, Pure Heroine, which was released worldwide on 30 September 2013.

In early September 2013, Little and co-writer Lorde were shortlisted for "Royals" in the 2013 Silver Scroll Award, which honours outstanding achievement in songwriting of original New Zealand pop music. They went on to win this award, at a ceremony on 16 October. He also won a Grammy Award on 26 January 2014, alongside Lorde, winning Song of the Year for "Royals".

Little produced Auckland-based pop duo Broods' single, "Bridges", subsequent EP, Broods, and their 2014 album, Evergreen.

In 2019, Little co-wrote and co-produced four songs with American singer-songwriter Taylor Swift for her seventh studio album Lover, including "Me!", "You Need to Calm Down", "The Man", and "Miss Americana & the Heartbreak Prince". Little and Swift also co-wrote and co-produced a fifth track, "Only the Young" which was left off the album. The track was released in 2020 in conjunction with Miss Americana, a documentary on Swift's life and career; Little appeared in the documentary.

 Little is based in Los Angeles.

Discography

With Goodnight Nurse 

 Always and Never (2006) Festival Mushroom Records
 Keep Me on Your Side (2008) Warner Music New Zealand

Production and writing credits

Awards and nominations

APRA awards

APRA Awards (Australia) 

The APRA Awards (Australia) are annually held by Australasian Performing Right Association to honour outstanding music artists and songwriters of the year.

! Ref.
|-
| style="text-align:center;" | 2014
| Ella Yelich-O'Connor and Joel Little
| Outstanding International Achievement Award
| 
|style="text-align:center;"|
|-
| style="text-align:center;" | 2016
| Jarryd James and Joel Little
| Pop Work of the Year
| 
|style="text-align:center;"|
|-
| style="text-align:center;" | 2021
| "Everybody Rise" by Amy Shark (Written by Shark and Joel Little)
| Song  of the Year
| 
|style="text-align:center;"|
|}

APRA Silver Scroll Awards (New Zealand) 

The New Zealand APRA Awards are held by the Australasian Performing Right Association to honour the finest songwriters and composers.

! Ref.
|-
|style="text-align:center;"| 2013
| Ella Yelich-O'Connor and Joel Little for "Royals"
| APRA Silver Scroll
| 
|style="text-align:center;"|  
|-
| style="text-align:center;" rowspan="3" | 2014
|Broods and Joel Little for "Bridges"
|APRA Silver Scroll
| 
|style="text-align:center;"|
|-
|Ella Yelich-O'Connor and Joel Little for "Team"
|Most Performed Work in New Zealand
| 
|style="text-align:center;"|
|-
|Ella Yelich-O'Connor and Joel Little for "Royals"
|Most Performed Work Overseas
| 
|style="text-align:center;"|
|-
| style="text-align:center;" rowspan="4" | 2015
| Ella Yelich-O'Connor and Joel Little for "Yellow Flicker Beat"
| APRA Silver Scroll
| 
| style="text-align:center;"|
|-
| Joel Little and Jarryd James for "Do You Remember"
| APRA Silver Scroll
| 
|style="text-align:center;"| 
|-
| Joel Little, Georgia Nott and Caleb Nott for "L.A.F."
| APRA Silver Scroll
| 
|style="text-align:center;"| 
|-
| Ella Yelich-O'Connor and Joel Little for "Royals"
|Most Performed Work Overseas
| 
| style="text-align:center;"|
|-
|style="text-align:center;"| 2017
| Ella Yelich-O'Connor, Jack Antonoff and Joel Little for "Green Light"
| APRA Silver Scroll
| 
|style="text-align:center;"|  
|}

ASCAP Pop Music Awards 
The annual ASCAP Pop Music Awards are held by the American Society of Composers, Authors and Publishers to honour the songwriters and publishers of the most performed pop songs in the United States. Some of his works (like those for Imagine Dragons) are controlled in the US by ASCAP's largest competitor, Broadcast Music, Inc. (BMI).

! Ref.
|-
| style="text-align:center;" | 2014
| Ella Yelich-O'Connor and Joel Little for "Royals"
| Most Performed Songs
| 
|style="text-align:center;"|
|-
| style="text-align:center;" rowspan="2" | 2015
|Ella Yelich-O'Connor and Joel Little -  "Team"
|Most Performed Songs
| 
|style="text-align:center;"|
|-
|Ella Yelich-O'Connor and Joel Little -  "Royals"
|Most Performed Songs
| 
|style="text-align:center;"|
|}

Golden Globe Awards 

The Golden Globe Awards were established in 1944 by the Hollywood Foreign Press Association to celebrate the best in film and television.

! Ref.
|-
|style="text-align:center;" | 2015
| Ella Yelich-O'Connor and Joel Little for "Yellow Flicker Beat" 
| Best Original Song || ||align="center"|
|}

Grammy Awards 

The Grammy Awards are awarded annually by the National Academy of Recording Arts and Sciences.

! Ref.
|-
| style="text-align:center;" rowspan="2" | 2014
| Lorde, artist; Joel Little, producer; Joel Little, engineer/mixer; Stuart Hawkes, mastering engineer for "Royals"
| 56th Annual Grammy Awards – Record of the Year
|  
|style="text-align:center;"| 

|-
| Ella Yelich-O'Connor and Joel Little, songwriters for "Royals"
| 56th Annual Grammy Awards – Song of the Year
| 
|style="text-align:center;"| 
|}

New Zealand Music Awards 

The New Zealand Music Awards are awarded annually to musicians of New Zealand origin, by Recorded Music NZ.

! Ref.
|-
|style="text-align:center;" rowspan="2" | 2014
|Joel Little for Pure Heroine
|Best Engineer
| 
|style="text-align:center;"|
|-
|Joel Little for Pure Heroine
|Best Producer
| 
|style="text-align:center;"|
|-
|style="text-align:center;" | 2015
|Joel Little for Evergreen
|Best Producer
| 
|style="text-align:center;"| 
|-
|style="text-align:center;" rowspan="2" | 2016
|Joel Little for Conscious
|Best Engineer
| 
|style="text-align:center;"| 
|-
|Joel Little for Conscious
|Best Producer
| 
|style="text-align:center;"| 
|}

References

External links 
 Official site

1983 births
APRA Award winners
Living people
Grammy Award winners
New Zealand record producers
New Zealand male singer-songwriters
Pop punk musicians
Musicians from Auckland
21st-century New Zealand male singers